Sarab-e Jaldan (also Romanized as Sarāb-e Jaldān and Sarāb-e Jaldūn) is a village in Gerit Rural District, Papi District, Khorramabad County, Lorestan Province, Iran. At the 2006 census, its population was 146, in 28 families.

References 

Towns and villages in Khorramabad County